The 2019 Grambling State Tigers baseball team represented Grambling State University in the 2019 NCAA Division I baseball season. The Tigers played their home games at Ralph Waldo Emerson Jones Park and Wilbert Ellis Field.

Roster

Coaching staff

Schedule

! style="" | Regular Season
|- valign="top" 

|- align="center" bgcolor="#ccffcc"
| 1 || February 15 || vs. Eastern Kentucky (Andre Dawson Classic) || Wesley Barrow Stadium • New Orleans, LA || W 7–4 || 1–0 ||
|- align="center" bgcolor="#ffcccc"
| 2 || February 16 || vs. Southern (Andre Dawson Classic) || Wesley Barrow Stadium • New Orleans, LA || L 5–6 || 1–1 ||
|- align="center" bgcolor="#ccffcc"
| 3 || February 17 || vs. Alabama State (Andre Dawson Classic) || Wesley Barrow Stadium • New Orleans, LA || W 3-1 || 2–1 || 
|- align="center" bgcolor="#ffcccc"
| 4 || February 20 || Jackson State || Ralph Waldo Emerson Jones Park and Wilbert Ellis Field • Grambling, LA || L 2–4 || 2–2 ||
|- align="center" bgcolor="#ffcccc"
| 5 || February 22 || at Nicholls || Ben Meyer Diamond at Ray E. Didier Field • Thibodaux, LA || L 1–6 || 2–3 ||
|- align="center" bgcolor="#ffcccc"
| 6 || February 24 || at Nicholls || Ben Meyer Diamond at Ray E. Didier Field • Thibodaux, LA || L 5–16 || 2–4 ||
|- align="center" bgcolor="#ffcccc"
| 7 || February 24 || at Nicholls || Ben Meyer Diamond at Ray E. Didier Field • Thibodaux, LA || L 2-7 || 2-5 ||
|- align="center" bgcolor="#ffcccc"
| 8 || February 26 || Wiley College || Ralph Waldo Emerson Jones Park and Wilbert Ellis Field • Grambling, LA || L 3–5 || 2–6 ||
|- align="center" bgcolor="#ccffcc"
| 8 || February 26 || Wiley College || Ralph Waldo Emerson Jones Park and Wilbert Ellis Field • Grambling, LA || W 8–3 || 3–6 ||
|-

|- align="center" bgcolor="#ccffcc"
| 9 || March 1 || Texas Southern || Ralph Waldo Emerson Jones Park and Wilbert Ellis Field • Grambling, LA || W 12–2 (7 inn) || 4–6 || 1-0
|- align="center" bgcolor="#ffcccc"
| 10 || March 2 || Texas Southern || Ralph Waldo Emerson Jones Park and Wilbert Ellis Field • Grambling, LA || L 3–7 || 4–7 || 1-1
|- align="center" bgcolor="#ccffcc"
| 11 || March 2 || Texas Southern || Ralph Waldo Emerson Jones Park and Wilbert Ellis Field • Grambling, LA || W 6–2 || 5–7 || 2-1
|- align="center" bgcolor="#ccffcc"
| 12 || March 8 || at Prairie View A&M || Tankersley Field • Prairie View, TX || W 9-1 || 6–7 || 3-1
|- align="center" bgcolor="#ccffcc"
| 13 || March 9 || at Prairie View A&M || Tankersley Field • Prairie View, TX || W 13–11 || 7–7 || 4-1
|- align="center" bgcolor="#ffcccc"
| 14 || March 10 || at Prairie View A&M || Tankersley Field • Prairie View, TX || L 15–18 || 7–8 || 4-2
|- align="center" bgcolor="#ffcccc"
| 15 || March 13 || at #7 Mississippi State || Dudy Noble Field, Polk–DeMent Stadium • Starkville, MS || L 1–18 || 7–9 || 4-3
|- align="center" bgcolor="#ccffcc"
| 16 || March 15 || Arkansas-Pine Bluff || Ralph Waldo Emerson Jones Park and Wilbert Ellis Field • Grambling, LA || W 11-0 (7 inn) || 8–9 || 5-3
|- align="center" bgcolor="#ccffcc"
| 17 || March 16 || Arkansas-Pine Bluff || Ralph Waldo Emerson Jones Park and Wilbert Ellis Field • Grambling, LA || W 5–4 (10 inn) || 9–9 || 6-3
|- align="center" bgcolor="#ccffcc"
| 18 || March 17 || Arkansas-Pine Bluff || Ralph Waldo Emerson Jones Park and Wilbert Ellis Field • Grambling, LA || W 4–1 || 10–9 || 7-3
|- align="center" bgcolor="#ffcccc"
| 19 || March 19 || at Jackson State || Braddy Field • Jackson, MS || L 2-10 || 10-10 ||
|- align="center" bgcolor="#ffcccc"
| 20 || March 22 || at Southern || Lee-Hines Field • Baton Rouge, LA || L 8-18 (8 inn) || 10–11 || 7-4
|- align="center" bgcolor="#ffcccc"
| 21 || March 23 || at Southern || Lee-Hines Field • Baton Rouge, LA || L 13-15 || 10–12 || 7-5
|- align="center" bgcolor="#ffcccc"
| 22 || March 24 || at Southern || Lee-Hines Field • Baton Rouge, LA || L 8-13 || 10–13 || 7-6
|- align="center" bgcolor="#ccffcc"
| 23 || March 26 || Alcorn State || Ralph Waldo Emerson Jones Park and Wilbert Ellis Field • Grambling, LA || W 8-7 || 11–13 ||
|- align="center" bgcolor="#ffcccc"
| 24 || March 29 || at Abilene Christian || Crutcher Scott Field • Abilene, TX || L 4-7 || 11–14 ||
|- align="center" bgcolor="#ffcccc"
| 25 || March 30 || at Abilene Christian || Crutcher Scott Field • Abilene, TX || L 5–23 (7 inn) || 11–15 || 
|- align="center" bgcolor="#ccffcc
| 26 || March 31 || at Abilene Christian || Crutcher Scott Field • Abilene, TX || W 8–7 || 11–16 ||
|-

|- align="center" bgcolor="#ffcccc"
| 27 || April 2 || at #9 LSU || Alex Box Stadium, Skip Bertman Field • Baton Rouge, LA || L 0-9 || 11–17 ||
|- align="center" bgcolor="#ffcccc"
| 28 || April 5 || at Texas Southern || MacGregor Park • Houston, TX || L 8–11 || 11–18 || 7–7
|- align="center" bgcolor="#ccffcc"
| 29 || April 6 || at Texas Southern || MacGregor Park • Houston, TX || W 7–2 || 12–18 || 8–7
|- align="center" bgcolor="#ccffcc"
| 30 || April 6 || at Texas Southern || MacGregor Park • Houston, TX || W 8–4 || 13–18 || 9–7
|- align="center" bgcolor="#ffcccc"
| 31 || April 9 || at Stephen F. Austin || Jaycees Field • Nacogdoches, TX || L 2-6 || 13-19 ||
|- align="center" bgcolor="#ccffcc"
| 32 || April 12 || Prairie View A&M || Ralph Waldo Emerson Jones Park and Wilbert Ellis Field • Grambling, LA || W 7–4 || 14–19 || 10–7
|- align="center" bgcolor="#ffcccc"
| 33 || April 12 || Prairie View A&M || Ralph Waldo Emerson Jones Park and Wilbert Ellis Field • Grambling, LA || L 7–10 || 14–20 || 10–8
|- align="center" bgcolor="#ccffcc"
| 34 || April 14 || Prairie View A&M || Ralph Waldo Emerson Jones Park and Wilbert Ellis Field • Grambling, LA || W 8–4 || 15–20 || 11–8
|- align="center" bgcolor="#ccffcc"
| 35 || April 16 || Mississippi Valley State || Ralph Waldo Emerson Jones Park and Wilbert Ellis Field • Grambling, LA || W 9–7 || 16–20 ||
|- align="center" bgcolor="#ccffcc"
| 36 || April 20 || at Arkansas-Pine Bluff || Torii Hunter Baseball Complex • Pine Bluff, AR || W 10-8 (11 inn) || 17–20 || 12–8
|- align="center" bgcolor="#ccffcc"
| 37 || April 20 || at Arkansas-Pine Bluff || Torii Hunter Baseball Complex • Pine Bluff, AR || W 19–2 (7 inn) || 18–20 || 13–8
|- align="center" bgcolor="#ccffcc"
| 38 || April 21 || at Arkansas-Pine Bluff || Torii Hunter Baseball Complex • Pine Bluff, AR || W 14–11 || 19–20 || 14-8
|- align="center" bgcolor="#ccffcc"
| 39 || April 23 || at Alcorn State || Foster Baseball Field at McGowen Stadium • Lorman, MS || W 14–7 || 20–20 || 
|- align="center" bgcolor="#ccffcc"
| 40 || April 26 || Southern || Ralph Waldo Emerson Jones Park and Wilbert Ellis Field • Grambling, LA || W 12–0 (7 inn) || 21–20 || 15-8
|- align="center" bgcolor="#ccffcc"
| 41 || April 27 || Southern || Ralph Waldo Emerson Jones Park and Wilbert Ellis Field • Grambling, LA || W 21–16 || 22–20 || 16-8
|- align="center" bgcolor="#ffcccc"
| 42 || April 28 || Southern || Ralph Waldo Emerson Jones Park and Wilbert Ellis Field • Grambling, LA || L 3–15 (7 inn) || 22–21 || 16-9
|- align="center" bgcolor="#ffcccc"
| 42 || April 30 || at #5 Arkansas || Dickey-Stephens Park • Little Rock, AR || L 3–17 || 22–22 ||
|-

|- align="center" bgcolor="#ccffcc"
| 43 || May 3 || at Northwestern State || H. Alvin Brown–C. C. Stroud Field • Natchitoches, LA || W 7–6 || 23–22 ||
|- align="center" bgcolor="#ffcccc"
| 44 || May 5 || at Northwestern State || H. Alvin Brown–C. C. Stroud Field • Natchitoches, LA || L 2-11 || 23–23 ||
|- align="center" bgcolor="#ffcccc"
| 45 || May 5 || at Northwestern State || H. Alvin Brown–C. C. Stroud Field • Natchitoches, LA || L 4–5 || 23–24 ||
|-

|-
! style="" | Post-Season
|- valign="top" 
|-
|-

|- align="center" bgcolor="#ccffcc"
| 55 || May 15 || vs. Alcorn State || Wesley Barrow Stadium • New Orleans, LA || W 14–8 (8 inn) || 24–24 ||
|- align="center" bgcolor="#ffcccc"
| 56 || May 16 || vs. Alabama State || Wesley Barrow Stadium • New Orleans, LA || L 3-5 || 24-25 ||
|- align="center" bgcolor="#ccffcc"
| 55 || May 17 || vs. Prairie View A&M || Wesley Barrow Stadium • New Orleans, LA || W 9–8 || 25–25 ||
|- align="center" bgcolor="#ccffcc"
| 55 || May 17 || vs. Alabama State || Wesley Barrow Stadium • New Orleans, LA || W 15-9 || 26–25 ||
|- align="center" bgcolor="#ffcccc"
| 55 || May 18 || vs. Alabama State || Wesley Barrow Stadium • New Orleans, LA || L 2-5 || 26–26 ||
|-

|-
|

References

Grambling State Tigers
Grambling State Tigers baseball seasons
Grambling State Tigers baseball